Copadichromis mbenjii is a species of haplochromine cichlid which is endemic to Lake Malawi.  It is only found around Mbenje Island from where it takes its specific name.

References

 FishGeeks Profile  Detailed profile including tank setup, feeding and husbandry.

Fish of Malawi
mbenjii
Taxonomy articles created by Polbot
Fish of Lake Malawi